The Angry Young Them is the first album by the Northern Irish rock and roll group Them.  The album was released in the UK in June 1965. The band's lead singer and songwriter was Van Morrison. In the U.S., the album was released as Them with partly different tracks.

Cover
As with several Decca releases of the period, the name of the group was conspicuously absent from the front cover and on the back of the LP they were introduced as The Angry Young Them with an essay on this theme declaring: "These five young rebels are outrageously true to themselves.  Defiant! Angry! Sad!  They are honest to the point of insult!"

Release history
Six of the songs on the album were Morrison originals, including the famous garage band anthem "Gloria". Another song on the album, "Mystic Eyes", was a spontaneous creation that came out of the band just "busking around" in Morrison's words and after seven minutes of instrumental playing he impulsively threw in the words of a song he had been working on. The lengthy versions of "Gloria" that the band performed at the Maritime and the ten-minute recording of "Mystic Eyes" have never surfaced. All that is left of the "Mystic Eyes" performance is the little over 2 minutes on the album that remained after splicing out from the beginning and ending.  "You Just Can't Win" was a Dylan inspired song about a gold digger, set in specific places in London such as Camden Town. "Little Girl"  was about a boy's obsession with a fourteen-year-old school girl (an earlier take on Lord's Taverners charity album had been deleted when a four-letter word was heard in the fade out at the end). "If You And I Could Be As Two" starts with a spoken introduction by Morrison with an aggressive Irish accent. Three Bert Berns originals were included and a cover of John Lee Hooker's "Don't Look Back" was considered by Morrison to be his finest vocal to date.

Track listing

British version

Track listing

Side one
"Mystic Eyes" (Van Morrison) – 2:41
"If You and I Could Be as Two" (Morrison) – 2:53
"Little Girl" (Morrison) – 2:21
"Just a Little Bit" (Ralph Bass, Buster Brown, John Thornton, Ferdinand "Fats" Washington) – 2:21
"I Gave My Love a Diamond" (Bert Berns, Wes Farrell) – 2:48
"Gloria" (Morrison) – 2:38
"You Just Can't Win" (Morrison) – 2:21

Side two
"Go on Home Baby" (Berns, Farrell) – 2:39
"Don't Look Back" (John Lee Hooker) – 3:23
"I Like It Like That" (Morrison) – 3:35
"I'm Gonna Dress in Black" (M. Gillon aka Tommy Scott, M. Howe) – 3:34
"Bright Lights, Big City" (Jimmy Reed) – 2:30
"My Little Baby" (Berns, Farrell) – 2:00
"(Get Your Kicks On) Route 66" (Bobby Troup) – 2:22

North American version

Track listing

Side one
"Here Comes the Night" (Berns) – 2:45
"Mystic Eyes" – 2:41
"Don't Look Back" – 3:23
"Little Girl" – 2:21
"One Two Brown Eyes" (Morrison) – 2:39
"Gloria" – 2:38

Side two
"One More Time" - 2:47
"If You and I Could Be as Two" – 2:53
"I Like It Like That" – 3:35
"I'm Gonna Dress in Black" – 3:34
 "(Get Your Kicks On) Route 66" – 2:22
"Go on Home Baby" – 2:39

Notes

References
Rogan, Johnny (2006). Van Morrison: No Surrender, London: Vintage Books 

Van Morrison albums
Them (band) albums
1965 debut albums
Decca Records albums
Parrot Records albums
Albums produced by Bert Berns
Albums produced by Dick Rowe